Eupithecia clavifera is a moth in the family Geometridae. It is found in Russia, China, Japan, Taiwan and Korea.

The wingspan is about 15–19 mm. Adults are on wing from March to May in one generation per year.

The larvae feed on Cornus controversa.

References

Moths described in 1955
clavifera
Moths of Asia